Qaleh-ye Mirza Ali (also Romanized as Qal‘eh-ye Mīrzā ‘Alī) is a village in Valanjerd Rural District, in the Central District of Borujerd County, Lorestan Province, Iran. At the 2006 census, its population was 210, in 49 families.

References 

Towns and villages in Borujerd County